
Imko Binnerts is a defunct restaurant located in the Grand Winston Hotel in Rijswijk, Netherlands. It was a fine dining restaurant that was awarded one Michelin star in both 2005 and 2006.

Head chef of the restaurant was Imko Binnerts. He is a chef specializing in fresh fish and seafood. Binnerts left the restaurant in 2006, because he was not feeling in the right spot. He moved to "Schmidt Zeevis", a major fish supplier in Rotterdam.

Before starting as an employee at the Grand Winston Hotel, he had his own restaurant Imko's in IJmuiden that went bankrupt in 2004.

See also
List of Michelin starred restaurants in the Netherlands

References 

Restaurants in Rijswijk
Michelin Guide starred restaurants in the Netherlands
Defunct restaurants in the Netherlands